Libethenite is a rare copper phosphate hydroxide mineral. It forms striking, dark green orthorhombic crystals. It was discovered in 1823 in Ľubietová, Slovakia and is named after the German name of that locality (Libethen). Libethenite has also been found in the Miguel Vacas Mine, Conceição, Vila Viçosa, Évora District, Portugal, and in Tier des Carrières, Cahai, Vielsaim, Stavelot Massif, Luxembourg Province, Belgium.

Appearance 
 
Libethenite almost always takes the form of dark-green orthorhombic crystals. It is often found in clusters with other libethenite crystals.

Formation 
Libethenite is found in the oxidized zone of copper ore deposits. It is most often formed from the weathering of phosphate rocks such as apatite, monazite, and xenotime. There have been no confirmed findings of primary libethenite, although a probable case has been reported.

References

Copper(II) minerals
Phosphate minerals
Orthorhombic minerals
Minerals in space group 58